Secret Story - Casa dos Segredos: Desafio Final 4 - Agora ou Nunca is the fourth all-stars of the  Secret Story: Desafio Final format and overall fifth all-stars season with housemates from previous seasons of the Portuguese version of the reality show Secret Story, which based on the original French version and of Big Brother.

The season began on 8 January 2017 and finished 22 days later on 29 January 2017. This time, the show will also have another housemate from another reality shows like, Love On Top and A Quinta. Portugal was the first country worldwide to have five all-star seasons of the Big Brother format.

Carlos Sousa was the winner.

Housemates

Andreia 
Andreia Silva was a contestant on Love on Top 1 and Love on Top 3.
 Results:
 Love on Top 1: She was the female runner-up on Love on Top 1.
 Love on Top 3: She was the winner on Love on Top 3 with 47% of the votes to win.
 Secret Story: Desafio Final 4: She was ejected on Day 15 by Diogo S. of Secret Story 6.

Angélica 
Angélica Jordão was a contestant on A Quinta and A Quinta: O Desafio.
 Results:
 A Quinta: She was the 9th contestant to be evicted against Luna with 47% of the votes to save.
 A Quinta: O Desafio: She walked from the House on Day 15.
 Secret Story: Desafio Final 4: She was the 5th housemate to be evicted against Filipe and Rui with 43% of the votes to evict.

Carlos 
Carlos Sousa was a housemate in Secret Story 2, Desafio Final 1, and Desafio Final 3.
 Results:
 Secret Story 2: He was the 7th housemate to be evicted on Secret Story 2, against João J. and Marco with 50% of the votes. to evict.
 Secret Story: Desafio Final 1: He was the 5th Finalist in the Final of Desafio Final 1 with 5% of the votes to win.
 Secret Story: Desafio Final 3: He was the 4th Finalist with 13% of the votes to win.
 Secret Story: Desafio Final 4: He was the Winner with 66% of the votes to win.

Cláudio 
Cláudio Coelho was a housemate in Secret Story 6.
 Results:
 Secret Story 6: He was ejected on Day 43 for disrespectful behavior toward "A Voz".
 Secret Story: Desafio Final 4: He entered the House on Day 1. He was the 3rd housemate to be evicted against Gonçalo, Nuno and Rui with 41% of the votes to evict.

Cristiana 
Cristiana Dionísio was a housemate in Secret Story 5, Desafio Final 3, and A Quinta: O Desafio.
 Results:
 Secret Story 5: She was the 16th housemate to be evicted on Secret Story 5 against all the other housemates with 6% of the votes to save.
 Secret Story: Desafio Final 3: She was the runner-up with 17% of the votes to win.
 A Quinta: O Desafio: She was the 1st housemate evicted against Angélica and Liliana A. with 42% of the votes to evict.
 Secret Story: Desafio Final 4: She was the 6th housemate to be evicted against Rui and Sofia with 57% of the votes to evict.

Érica 
Érica Silva was a housemate in Secret Story 4, Desafio Final 2, Desafio Final 3, A Quinta, and A Quinta: O Desafio.
 Results:
 Secret Story 4: She was the 4th Finalist in the Final of Secret Story 4, with 8% of the votes to win.
 Secret Story: Desafio Final 2: She was the winner of Secret Story: Desafio Final 2, with 58% of the votes to win.
 Secret Story: Desafio Final 3: She was the 8th housemate to be evicted against Diana and Sofia with 73% of the votes to evict.
 A Quinta: She was the 12th housemate to be evicted against Kelly, Marta, and Romana with 12% of the votes to save.
 A Quinta: O Desafio: She was the 4th housemate to be evicted against Tiago, Juliana and Carlos with 15% of the votes to save.
 Secret Story: Desafio Final 4: She was the 5th Finalist with 8% of the votes to win.

Esteves 
Bruno Esteves was a contestant on Love on Top 1 and Love on Top 3.
 Results:
 Love on Top 1: He was a male finalist on Love on Top 1.
 Love on Top 3: He was the male winner on Love on Top 3 with 36% of the votes to win.
 Secret Story: Desafio Final 4: He was ejected on Day 8 after failing a challenge set to him by Secret Story 5 housemate Bruno.

Filipe 
Filipe Vilarinho was a contestant on Love on Top 1.
 Results:
 Love on Top 1: He was the male winner of Love on Top 1 with 70% of the votes to win.
 Secret Story: Desafio Final 4: He was the 3rd Finalist with 18% of the votes to win.

Gonçalo 
Gonçalo Quinaz was a contestant on A Quinta.
 Results:
 A Quinta: He was the 4th Finalist with 11% of the votes to win.
 Secret Story: Desafio Final 4: He was the 4th Finalist with 14% of the votes to win.

Kika 
Kika Gomes was a contestant on Secret Story 6.
 Results:
 Secret Story 6: She was the 5th housemate to be evicted against Helena and Mariana with 79% of the votes to evict.
 Secret Story: Desafio Final 4: She was the 2nd housemate to be evicted against Cláudio and Vânia with 44% of the vote to evict.

Lia 
Eliane «Lia» Tchissola was a contestant on Love on Top 1 and Love on Top 3.
 Results:
 Love on Top 1: She was the female winner of Love on Top 1 with 39% of the votes to win.
 Love on Top 3: She was a female finalist on Love on Top 3.
 Secret Story: Desafio Final 4: She was the 6th Finalist with 5% of the votes to win.

Nuno 
Nuno Jesus was a contestant on Secret Story 6.
 Results:
 Secret Story 6: He was the 8th housemate to be evicted against Diogo and Helena with 69% of the votes to evict.
 Secret Story: Desafio Final 4: He was ejected on Day 15 after failing a challenge set to him by Secret Story 4 housemate Tierry.

Rita 
Rita Rosendo was a contestant on Secret Story 6.
 Results:
 Secret Story 6: She was ejected on Day 43 for disrespectful behavior toward "A Voz".
 Secret Story: Desafio Final 4: She was the 1st housemate to be evicted against Cláudio, Kika, and Vânia with 31% of the vote to evict.

Rui 
Rui Rodrigues was a contestant on Love on Top 1 and Love on Top 3.
 Results:
 Love on Top 1: He was a male finalist on Love on Top 1.
 Love on Top 3: He was the male runner-up on Love on Top 3.
 Secret Story: Desafio Final 4: He was ejected on Day 18 for having the most "Nuncas" of the remaining housemates.

Sofia 
Sofia Sousa was a housemate in Secret Story 4 and Desafio Final 3.
 Results:
 Secret Story 4: She was the 2nd Finalist of Secret Story 4 with 30% of the votes to win.
 Secret Story: Desafio Final 3: She was the winner with 44% of the votes to win.
 Secret Story: Desafio Final 4: She was the 2nd Finalist with 34% of the votes to win.

Vânia 
Vânia Sá was a housemate in Secret Story 5 and Desafio Final 3.
 Results:
 Secret Story 5: She was the 7th housemate to be evicted from Secret Story 5, against Cinthia and Agnes with 52% of the votes.
 Secret Story: Desafio Final 3: She was the 6th housemate to be evicted against Érica and Joana with 53% of the vote.
 Secret Story: Desafio Final 4: She was the 4th housemate to be evicted against Angélica, Filipe and Rui with 36% of the votes to evict.

Secrets 
In this All-Stars season, there are two secrets: house's secret and A Voz's secret.

Nominations table

Notes

Nominations total received

Nominations: Results 

 Votes to evict
 Votes to win

Twists

Main and Glass House 
Like the previous season, the Main House had a smaller house, the Glass House. Located on the backyard, it's a small place where a few housemates will have to live on it and can't leave it exempt on special occasions like eviction shows or nominations. The housemates on the Glass House have a full status like the ones in the Main House and can nominate, they will only have to live there.

 On Day 1, Érica, Esteves and Lia were challenged by "A Voz" to give "Agora" and "Nunca" to the pair of housemates. Because of that, they went to the Glass House.
 On Day 4, "A Voz" gives the opportunity to Érica, Esteves and Lia to choose three housemates to go to the Glass House. The housemates who went to the Glass House were Cristiana, Rui and Sofia.
 On Day 8, houseguest Helena (winner of last season) was given the power to send 3 males to the Glass House. She chose Esteves, Filipe and Rui. As Esteves was later ejected, he had to choose a substitute for him in the Glass House. He chose Carlos.
 On Day 9, houseguest Bernardina (housemate of Secret Story 4), before she left, was given the power to send 3 housemates to the Glass House. She chose Érica, Filipe and Sofia.
 On Day 10, Érica won a competition against Filipe and Sofia. "A Voz" gave her the opportunity to leave the Glass House or take someone out of the Glass House. She chose to take Filipe out.
 On Day 15, various houseguests decided which housemates would go to the Glass House. Marco (housemate of Secret Story 2) chose Filipe, Tierry (housemate of Secret Story 4) chose Andreia. As Andreia was later ejected, Diogo (housemate of Secret Story 6) and Pedro (housemate of Secret Story 5) had to each chose one housemate and they chose Gonçalo and Lia respectively.

Leader of the House 
Adapted from last season's Housemate of the Week, the now called Leader of the House has similar tasks from its previous role: an election normally done on Mondays was implemented in which the housemate elected wins a prominent position in the game that week: the housemate gets to wear a special golden microphone, has several rewards in the House, usually serves as the leader of housework and others related and gets to break the ties at the nominations if they appear, although only if the Leader of the House is not involved in that tie. Throughout the weeks the method of election changes, but the most common ones are a vote between the housemates and elections through tasks done by "A Voz".

Final Prize 
Similar to the twist of A Quinta: O Desafio, the final prize for the winner was initially €10,000. However, if housemates disregard the rules, a certain amount will be removed from the final prize, or else, go up if the housemates win tasks.

Ratings

Live Eviction Shows 
The Live Eviction shows air every Sunday at 9:30 pm.

Nomination and Special Shows 
The Nomination and Special Shows are aired every Wednesday at 7:15 pm.

References

External links 
 Official Website 
 Fan Website 

Desafio Final 4
2017 Portuguese television seasons